Milișăuți is a town in Suceava County, northeastern Romania. It is situated in the historical region of Bukovina. Milișăuți is the fifteenth largest urban settlement in the county, with a population of 4,958 inhabitants, according to the 2011 census. It was declared a town in 2004, along with seven other localities in Suceava County. The town administers the former village of Bădeuți (which became a neighborhood in 2004) and Gara and Lunca (with the status of associated villages). Iaslovăț village was also part of Milișăuți until 2002, when it was split off to form a separate commune.

The locality was called Emil Bodnăraș from 7 September 1976 to 20 May 1996. Milișăuți is located on the banks of Suceava River and it is relatively close to the city of Rădăuți (8 km away). Despite being a town, the main occupation of the local people is agriculture. Milișăuți is known for its production of cabbage and cucumber.

Administration and local politics

Town council 

The town's current local council has the following political composition, according to the results of the 2020 Romanian local elections:

Notes

External links

  Milișăuți Town Hall official site
  A blog about Milișăuți
  Milișăuți, orașul varză – Newspaper article about Milișăuți
  Suceava County site – Milișăuți web page

Towns in Romania
Populated places in Suceava County
Localities in Southern Bukovina